The following is a list of notable deaths in June 2015.

Entries for each day are listed alphabetically by surname. A typical entry lists information in the following sequence:
Name, age, country of citizenship and reason for notability, established cause of death, reference.

June 2015

1
*Alexandra Prinzessin von Hannover, 77, German politician.
*An Jun Can, 31, Taiwanese singer (Comic Boyz) and actor, liver cancer.
Katherine Chappell, 29, American visual effects editor (Game of Thrones, Captain America: The Winter Soldier, Godzilla), lion attack.
Jon Hensley, 31, American radio personality, asphyxiation.
Charles Jacob, 94, English stockbroker.
Charles Kennedy, 55, British politician, Leader of the Liberal Democrats (1999–2006), MP (1983–2015), internal haemorrhage.
Joan Kirner, 76, Australian politician, Premier of Victoria (1990–1992), oesophageal cancer.
Peter Kruse, 60, German psychologist, heart failure.
Nicholas Liverpool, 80, Dominican politician, President (2003–2012).
Nobutaka Machimura, 70, Japanese politician, Speaker of the House of Representatives (2014–2015), Minister for Foreign Affairs (2004–2006, 2007), cerebral infarction.
Buck Moyer, 94, American Lutheran pastor, Bishop of the Virginia Synod (1976–1987).
Jacques Parizeau, 84, Canadian politician, Premier of Quebec (1994–1996).
Kirill Pokrovsky, 53, Russian composer.
Serajur Rahman, 81, Bangladeshi journalist and broadcaster.
Sonya Rapoport, 92, American conceptual and digital artist, pancreatic cancer.
Jean Ritchie, 92, American folk singer and song collector.
Tommy Rogers, 54, American professional wrestler (The Fantastics).
Andy Scrivani, 98, American Olympic boxer (1936).
Dolores Richard Spikes, 78, American mathematician.
Phili Viehoff, 90, Dutch politician, member of the European Parliament (1979–1989).
Tadeusz Józef Zawistowski, 85, Polish Roman Catholic prelate, Auxiliary Bishop of Łomża (1973–2006).
Robert K. Zukowski, 85, American farmer and politician.

2
Ifeoma Aggrey-Fynn, 34, Nigerian media personality, shot.
Claudio Angelini, 72, Italian political correspondent.
Fernando de Araújo, 52, East Timorese politician, President of the National Parliament (2007–2012), Acting President (2008), stroke.
Miguel-Ángel Cárdenas, 80, Colombian-born Dutch artist.
Shufti Chaudhri, 95, Pakistani World War II British Indian Army officer.
Martin Cole, 83, British sexologist.
Alberto De Martino, 85, Italian film director (O.K. Connery, Holocaust 2000, The Pumaman).
Walter Dexter, 83, Canadian ceramic artist.
Giovan Battista Fabbri, 89, Italian football player and manager (Vicenza).
Ortho R. Fairbanks, 90, American sculptor.
Dennis Fidler, 76, English footballer (Halifax Town, Macclesfield Town).
Gene Maddox, 76, American politician, Mayor of Clive, Iowa (1977–1992), member of the Iowa General Assembly (1993–2007).
Gordon S. Marshall, 95, American electronics entrepreneur and philanthropist.
John Mellekas, 81, American football player (Chicago Bears, San Francisco 49ers, Philadelphia Eagles).
Eugen Mwaiposa, 54, Tanzanian politician, MP for Ukonga (since 2010).
Clemens Nathan, 81, British humanitarian.
Bijoya Ray, 98, Indian actress, pneumonia.
Irwin Rose, 88, American biologist, Nobel laureate (2004).
Theo Saat, 87, Dutch Olympic sprinter (1952).
Shockley Shoemake, 92, American politician.
Silvio Spaccesi, 88, Italian actor and voice actor.
Kenneth Tempest, 93, British World War II Royal Air Force navigator.
Besim Üstünel, 88, Turkish academic and politician.
Tsonyo Vasilev, 63, Bulgarian footballer (CSKA Sofia).
Carmine Vingo, 85, American heavyweight boxer.
Herb Wakabayashi, 70, Canadian-born Japanese Olympic ice hockey player (1972, 1976, 1980).
Charls Walker, 91, American economist and lobbyist.
Norm Weiss, 79, Canadian politician.
Stephen Wojdak, 76, American lobbyist and politician, member of the Pennsylvania House of Representatives (1969–1976), respiratory failure.

3
Lester Bower, 67, American mass murderer, execution by lethal injection.
Horst Brandstätter, 81, German company owner, founder of Playmobil.
Thomas Flynn, 83, Irish Roman Catholic prelate, Bishop of Achonry (1976–2007).
Bevo Francis, 82, American college basketball player (Rio Grande College).
Leszek Hensler, 59, Polish Olympic hockey player.
Margaret Juntwait, 58, American radio broadcaster, host of Metropolitan Opera radio broadcasts (2004–2014), ovarian cancer.
Eugene Kennedy, 86, American psychologist and theologian.
Bud Kraehling, 96, American journalist and weatherman, cancer.
Ricardo Morán, 74, Argentine actor.
Nidoïsh Naisseline, 69, New Caledonian politician, President of Loyalty Islands Province (1995–1999).
Fouad Qandil, 71, Egyptian author.
Imre Rapp, 77, Hungarian international football player.

4
Avi Beker, 64, Israeli academic, secretary-general of the World Jewish Congress (2001–2003).
Bengt Berndtsson, 82, Swedish footballer (IFK Göteborg).
Edith Hancke, 86, German actress.
Wayne Harris, 77, American Hall of Fame CFL football player (Calgary Stampeders).
Hugh Johnson, 69, Irish cinematographer (The Chronicles of Riddick, G.I. Jane, Eragon).
Charlie Morris, 88, British-born Australian naval officer and Olympic hammer thrower (1956).
Marguerite Patten, 99, British cookery writer, home economist and broadcaster.
Leonid Plyushch, 77, Ukrainian Soviet dissident and mathematician.
Jørgen Ravn, 75, Danish footballer (Aberdeen).
Henry Sampson, American electrical engineer and inventor.
Roy Stroud, 90, English footballer (West Ham).
Jabe Thomas, 85, American racecar driver (NASCAR), complications from Parkinson's disease.
Dame Anne Warburton, 87, British diplomat, Ambassador to Denmark (1976–1983), Permanent Representative to the UN in Geneva (1983–1985), President of Lucy Cavendish College (1985–1994).
Kurt Weber, 87, Polish cinematographer (Salto).
Ray Weigh, 86, Welsh footballer.
Albert West, 65, Dutch singer (The Shuffles) and record producer.
Hermann Zapf, 96, German typeface designer (Optima, Palatino, Zapfino).

5
Mehmet Abbasoğlu, 59, Turkish Kurdish politician, cancer.
Govindrao Adik, 76, Indian politician.
Tariq Aziz, 79, Iraqi politician, Foreign Minister (1983–1991), heart attack.
Eshel Ben-Jacob, 63, Israeli physicist.
Alan Bond, 77, British-born Australian businessman and convicted fraudster, complications from heart surgery.
Sadun Boro, 87, Turkish sailor, bladder cancer.
Manuel Camacho Solís, 69, Mexican politician, Mayor of Mexico City (1988–1993), Foreign Minister (1993–1994), Senator (since 2012).
Kazuo Chiba, 75, Japanese Aikido teacher.
Jerry Collins, 34, Samoan-born New Zealand rugby union player (national team), traffic collision.
Xavier de Roux, 74, French politician.
Frits Dragstra, 87, Dutch politician, member of the House of Representatives (1972–1977).
Giacomo Furia, 90, Italian actor (The Band of Honest Men, The Gold of Naples).
Anita Hagen, 84, Canadian politician, cancer.
Jane Briggs Hart, 93, American aviator, member of the Mercury 13, founding member of NOW, Alzheimer's disease.
Ralph Hyde, 76, British curator.
Jill Hyem, 78, British scriptwriter and actress.
Julien Mawule Kouto, 68, Togolese Roman Catholic prelate, Bishop of Atakpamé (1993–2006).
Colette Marchand, 90, French ballerina and actress (Moulin Rouge).
Te Uruhina McGarvey, 87, New Zealand Māori elder.
Worth McMillion, 88, American racing car driver.
Paul A. Miller, 98, American academic, President of the Rochester Institute of Technology (1969–1979).
Irving Mondschein, 91, American Olympic athlete (1948) and coach.
Robbi Sapinggi, 30, Malaysian mountain guide, earthquake.
Lecretia Seales, 42, New Zealand lawyer and right-to-die campaigner, brain cancer.
George Seitz, 73, Australian politician, member of the Victorian Legislative Assembly for Keilor (1982–2010).
Paolo Tullio, 65, Italian-born Irish Michelin Star-winning chef (Armstrong's Barn) and resident food critic (The Restaurant).
Roger Vergé, 85, French chef, co-founder of Nouvelle Cuisine, complications of diabetes.
Seth Winston, 64, American screenwriter and director (She's Out of Control, Session Man), Oscar winner (1992), heart attack.

6
Barry Albin-Dyer, 64, British undertaker, brain cancer.
Aarthi Agarwal, 31, American Telugu cinema actress, heart attack.
Pierre Brice, 86, French actor (Old Shatterhand, Mill of the Stone Women), pneumonia.
M. N. Buch, 80, Indian urban planner.
Vincent Bugliosi, 80, American prosecuting attorney (Tate–LaBianca murders case) and author (Helter Skelter, Reclaiming History), cancer.
Callisto Cosulich, 92, Italian film critic, author and screenwriter (Planet of the Vampires).
Jorge Galemire, 64, Uruguayan musician (Trelew).
Ronnie Gilbert, 88, American singer-songwriter (The Weavers) and actress (Running on Empty).
Colin Jackson, 68, Scottish footballer (Rangers, national team), leukaemia.
Richard Johnson, 87, English actor (The Haunting, Julius Caesar, The Boy in the Striped Pyjamas).
Dieter Medicus, 86, German jurist.
Nyla Murphy, 83, American politician, bile duct cancer.
Steve Nave, American actor and casting director, cancer.
Steve Pritko, 94, American football player (Cleveland Rams).
Feras Saied, 34, Syrian bodybuilder, traffic collision.
Sergey Sharikov, 40, Russian sabre fencer, two-time Olympic champion (1996, 2000), traffic collision.
Ludvík Vaculík, 88, Czech writer and journalist.
John Williams, 87, American art historian.

7
Sheikh Razzak Ali, 86, Bangladeshi politician.
Ken Barrett, 77, English footballer (Aston Villa).
Giuseppe Casarrubea, 69, Italian historian and author.
Robert K. Casey, 83, American physician and politician.
Ahmad Ghazi, 79, Iranian Kurdish writer and translator.
Jimmy Goins, 66, American tribal politician, Chairman of the Lumbee Tribe (2004–2010), traffic collision.
John Hurry, 95, British World War II air force officer.
Felicia Kentridge, 84, South African lawyer and anti-apartheid activist, progressive supranuclear palsy.
Harold LeDoux, 88, American cartoonist (Judge Parker).
Sir Christopher Lee, 93, British actor (Dracula, The Lord of the Rings, Star Wars), voice artist, and singer, heart failure.
Michael Oliver, 89, British cardiologist.
Sean Pappas, 49, South African golfer, heart attack.
Peter Petherick, 72, New Zealand cricketer (Otago, Wellington, national team).
Gwilym Prichard, 84, Welsh painter.
Jane Riga, 41, Estonian mountain climber, avalanche.
Cole Tucker, 61, American pornographic actor, complications from AIDS.
Vasili Zhupikov, 61, Russian footballer.

8
Archie Alleyne, 82, Canadian jazz drummer, cancer.
Paul Bacon, 91, American book and album cover designer and jazz musician.
Muhammad Sharif Butt, 89, Pakistani Olympic sprinter (1948, 1952, 1956).
Frank Cappuccino, 86, American boxing referee, Alzheimer's disease.
Marie-Louise Carven, 105, French fashion designer.
Thomas Chambers, 83, South African cricketer.
Aldo da Rosa, 97, Brazilian electrical engineer.
Eugenia Davitashvili, 65, Russian faith healer.
Mervin Field, 94, American opinion pollster.
Jack Grimsley, 89, Australian musical director and composer.
Jean Gruault, 90, French screenwriter (My American Uncle) and actor.
Otakar Hořínek, 86, Czech sport shooter, Olympic silver medalist (1956).
Bill Kindricks, 68, American football player.
Valery Levental, 76, Russian theater stage designer.
Elizabeth Peet McIntosh, 100, American spy, heart attack.
Lynn Miles, 71, American human rights and Taiwan democracy activist, cancer.
Tiki Nxumalo, 65, South African actor, asthma attack.
Dasaradhi Rangacharya, 86, Indian writer and politician.
Ivanka Raspopović, 85, Serbian modernist architect.
David Rotem, 66, Israeli politician, member of the Knesset for Yisrael Beiteinu (2007–2015), cardiac arrest.
Chea Sim, 81, Cambodian politician, President of the Cambodian People's Party (since 1991).
Laurie Thompson, 77, British translator.
Peter van Wijmen, 76, Dutch lawyer, professor and politician, member of the House of Representatives (1998–2002).

9
Finn Backer, 87, Norwegian Supreme Court judge.
Larry Eschen, 94, American baseball player (Philadelphia Athletics).
Hemant Kanitkar, 72, Indian Test cricketer.
Igor Kostin, 78, Romanian-born Ukrainian photographer, took first pictures of Chernobyl disaster, traffic collision.
James Last, 86, German composer and big band leader.
Fred Anton Maier, 76, Norwegian speed skater, Olympic champion (1968), cancer.
Amos Midzi, 62, Zimbabwean politician and diplomat, poisoned.
Vincent Musetto, 74, American film critic (New York Post), pancreatic cancer.
Pumpkinhead, 39, American rapper.
Rainer Riehn, 73, German composer and conductor.
Alvin J. Salkind, 87, American chemical engineer.
Sir Peter Williams, 80, New Zealand lawyer, prostate cancer.
Pedro Zerolo, 55, Venezuelan-born Spanish politician, pancreatic cancer.

10
David Bellotti, 71, British politician and football executive, MP for Eastbourne (1990–1992), CEO of Brighton & Hove Albion.
Bonecrusher, 32, New Zealand Thoroughbred racehorse, euthanized following laminitis.
Robert Chartoff, 81, American film producer (Rocky, Raging Bull, Ender's Game), Oscar winner (1977), pancreatic cancer.
Larry Fisher, 65, Canadian convicted murderer (David Milgaard case).
Johnny Fullam, 75, Irish footballer (Shamrock Rovers).
Charles Wyndham Goodwyn, 81, British philatelist, Keeper of the Royal Philatelic Collection (1995–2003).
Elizabeth Griffin, 70, First Female Barrister in Montserrat. 
Esther Harrison, 69, American politician, member of the Mississippi House of Representatives for the 41st District (since 2001).
Hugo Höllenreiner, 81, German Sinti Porajmos survivor.
Wolfgang Jeschke, 78, German science fiction author (The Last Day of Creation).
Coetie Neethling, 82, South African cricketer.
Héctor Pérez Plazola, 81, Mexican politician.
Ray Reidy, 78, Irish priest and hurler (Tipperary).
Henry E. Riggs, 80, American academic.
Geoff Robinson, 71, English cricketer.
Judith St. George, 84, American author (So You Want to Be President?).
Brian Taylor, 78, English footballer (Walsall, Shrewsbury Town).

11
Jim Ed Brown, 81, American country singer (The Browns), lung cancer.
Arshad Chaudhry, 65, Pakistani Olympic bronze medallist field hockey player (1976).
Ornette Coleman, 85, American saxophonist and free jazz pioneer, cardiac arrest.
Vittorio De Angelis, 52, Italian voice actor, heart attack.
Jack King, 84, American public affairs officer (NASA), heart failure.
Sarah Kyolaba, 59, Ugandan businesswoman, cancer.
Sebastiano Mannironi, 84, Italian Olympic weightlifter (1956, 1960, 1964).
Ian McKechnie, 73, Scottish footballer (Hull City).
Ron Moody, 91, British actor (Oliver!, The Animals of Farthing Wood, EastEnders).
Mary Mulvihill, 55, Irish science writer.
David Premack, 89, American psychologist (Premack's principle).
Dusty Rhodes, 69, American professional wrestler, booker (NWA, WCW, WWE) and promoter (TCW), Hall of Fame (2007, 2010), kidney failure.
James Robertson, 86, Scottish footballer (Brentford).
Donald Sheldon, 85, American Olympic cyclist.
John Benjamin Stewart, 90, Canadian politician, MP for Antigonish—Guysborough (1962–1968).
Charles Williams, 90, British Royal Navy rear admiral.

12
Nasir al-Wuhayshi, 38, Yemeni Islamist militant, leader of AQAP, airstrike.
Shoshana Arbeli-Almozlino, 89, Iraqi-born Israeli politician, Minister of Health (1986–1988), Alzheimer's disease.
Fernando Brant, 68, Brazilian poet and composer, complications of liver transplantation.
Nek Chand, 90, Indian artist.
Pierre Dolbeault, 90, French mathematician.
Rick Ducommun, 62, Canadian actor (The 'Burbs, Scary Movie, Die Hard), complications from diabetes.
Micol Fontana, 101, Italian fashion designer and entrepreneur (Sorelle Fontana).
James Gowan, 91, British architect.
Monica Lewis, 93, American singer and actress (Earthquake), voice of Chiquita Banana (since 1947).
Frederick Pei Li, 75, Chinese-born American physician, Alzheimer's disease.
Thomas Mayer, 88, American economist.
José Messias, 86, Brazilian musician and television personality, multiple organ failure from kidney disease.
Andrés Mora, 60, Mexican baseball player (Baltimore Orioles, Cleveland Indians), pneumonia.
Alain Nadaud, 66, French author and diplomat.
Antoni Pitxot, 81, Spanish painter.
Alexander Rondeli, 73, Georgian political scientist.
Jacques Rosay, 66, French test pilot (Airbus).
Max Spittle, 92, Australian VFL football player (Melbourne).
Patrick Lennox Tierney, 101, American art historian and Japanologist.
Sümer Tilmaç, 67, Turkish actor, heart attack.
Ernest Tomlinson, 90, British composer (Monty Python's Flying Circus).

13
Big Time Sarah, 62, American blues singer.
Buddy Boudreaux, 97, American jazz saxophonist and band leader.
Allan Browne, 70, Australian jazz drummer.
Tomás Ó Con Cheanainn, 94, Irish historian.
Darius Dhlomo, 83, South African boxer, footballer and musician.
Russell J. Donnelly, 85, Canadian physicist.
Drs. P, 95, Swiss-born Dutch writer, composer and singer.
Magnus Härenstam, 73, Swedish actor (Sällskapsresan, Göta kanal eller Vem drog ur proppen?, Fem myror är fler än fyra elefanter) and comedian, spinal cancer.
Junix Inocian, 64, Filipino actor (Sinbad, Mortdecai).
Sheila Kaul, 100, Indian politician, Governor of Himachal Pradesh (1995–1996).
Graham Lord, 72, British biographer (Jeffrey Bernard, Arthur Lowe, Joan Collins) and novelist, liver cancer.
David Oniya, 30, Nigerian footballer, heart attack.
Sergio Renán, 82, Argentine actor, director and screenwriter (The Truce).
David C. Richardson, 101, American navy vice admiral.
Walter Scheib, 61, American chef, White House Executive Chef (1994–2005), drowning.
Mike Shrimpton, 74, New Zealand cricket player (national team) and coach (women's national team, 2000 Women's World Cup winner).
Phillip Toyne, 67, Australian environmental and indigenous affairs activist, bowel cancer.
George Winslow, 69, American child actor (Gentlemen Prefer Blondes, My Pal Gus), heart attack.

14
George Arthur, 46, Ghanaian football player and coach, cardiac arrest.
Bob Bedell, 70, American basketball player.
Hugo Blanco, 74, Venezuelan musician and composer ("Moliendo Café").
John Carroll, 73, American newspaper editor (Los Angeles Times, The Baltimore Sun), Creutzfeldt–Jakob disease.
Richard Cotton, 74, Australian geneticist (Human Variome Project).
Harri Czepuck, 87, German journalist.
Pasquale Foresi, 85, Italian priest and theologian.
Anne Nicol Gaylor, 88, American atheism and reproductive rights advocate, co-founder of the Freedom From Religion Foundation, complications from a fall.
Boris Godjunov, 74, Bulgarian singer.
Phil Judd, 81, English rugby union player (Coventry).
David Kennedy, 73, American film producer (Dark Shadows), complications following knee replacement surgery.
Hilary Masters, 87, American author.
Habibur Rahman Milon, 80, Bangladeshi journalist.
Peter Prier, 73, German-born American violin maker.
Edna Shavit, 80, Israeli academic professor (Tel Aviv University) and theatre director.
*Qiao Shi, 90, Chinese politician, Chairman of the National People's Congress.
Godfrey Steyn, 80, South African cricketer.
Walter Weller, 75, Austrian conductor and violinist.
Zito, 82, Brazilian footballer, World Cup-winning team member (1958, 1962), complications of a stroke.

15
Ali Awni al-Harzi, 29, Tunisian Islamic militant, air strike.
Wendy Coburn, 51, Canadian artist and academic.
Wilfried David, 69, Belgian professional cyclist, 1973 Tour de France stage winner, traffic collision.
Jean Doré, 70, Canadian politician, Mayor of Montreal (1986–1994), pancreatic cancer.
Gerry Duffy, 84, Irish cricketer.
Elisabeth Elliot, 88, American missionary and author.
Alv Jakob Fostervoll, 83, Norwegian politician, Governor of Møre og Romsdal (1977–2002), Minister of Defence (1971–1972, 1973–1976).
Jeanna Friske, 40, Russian singer (Blestyaschie), brain cancer.
Daniel W. Gade, 78, American geographer.
Howard Johnson, 89, English footballer (Sheffield United).
Kirk Kerkorian, 98, American businessman.
Magdalena Kopp, 67, German photographer and political activist.
Mighty Sam McClain, 72, American soul blues singer, stroke.
António Marques Mendes, 81, Portuguese lawyer and politician.
Jesús Moroles, 64, American sculptor, traffic collision.
Rosalind Rowe, 82, English table tennis player.
Harry Rowohlt, 70, German author.
Blaze Starr, 83, American stripper, burlesque comedian and club owner, subject of Blaze, heart failure.
Wu Kwok Hung, 66, Hong Kong international footballer, laryngeal cancer.

16
Stephen Blauner, 81, American manager and producer.
Charles Correa, 84, Indian architect.
Poul Jessen, 89, Danish Olympic gymnast.
Rosalind McGee, 77, American politician, member of the Utah House of Representatives (2003–2008).
William Pajaud, 89, American artist.
Greg Parks, 48, Canadian ice hockey player (New York Islanders), Olympic silver medalist (1994).
Tony Ranasinghe, 77, Sri Lankan actor (Hanthane Kathawa, Duhulu Malak, Ahasin Polawata).
Bill Sirs, 95, British trade unionist.
Catharni Stern, 89, British sculptor.
Jean Vautrin, 82, French writer, filmmaker and critic.

17
Francisco Domingo Barbosa Da Silveira, 71, Uruguayan Roman Catholic prelate, Bishop of Minas (2004–2009).
Nicola Badalucco, 86, Italian screenwriter (The Damned, Death in Venice, The Gold Rimmed Glasses) and journalist.
Per Arne Bjerke, 63, Norwegian journalist and politician.
Chang Ch'ung-ho, 101, Chinese-born American poet, calligrapher, and Kunqu opera singer.
Ron Clarke, 78, Australian long distance runner, Olympic bronze medallist (1964), Mayor of the Gold Coast (2004–2012), kidney failure.
John David Crow, 79, American Heisman Trophy-winning football player (Texas A&M, Chicago/St. Louis Cardinals) and coach (Northeast Louisiana).
Süleyman Demirel, 90, Turkish politician, President (1993–2000), lung infection.
Nelson Doubleday, Jr., 81, American publisher (Doubleday) and Major League Baseball team owner (New York Mets), pneumonia.
Noah Hutchings, 92, American fundamentalist evangelist and radio personality.
Jimmy Lee, 62, American investment banker, heart attack.
Roberto M. Levingston, 95, Argentine politician, President (1970–1971).
Clementa C. Pinckney, 41, American politician and pastor, member of the South Carolina House of Representatives (1997–2000) and Senate (since 2000), shot.
Madan Mohan Punchhi, 81, Indian jurist, Chief Justice of India (1998).
Başar Sabuncu, 71, Turkish film director and screenwriter (Şalvar Davası).
Vlastimir Đuza Stojiljković, 85, Serbian actor.
Jeralean Talley, 116, American supercentenarian, world's oldest living person.
Bryan Vaughan, 84, Australian politician and lawyer.
Gumercindo Yudis, 71, Paraguayan footballer.

18
Phil Austin, 74, American comedian, writer, and musician (Firesign Theatre), aneurysm.
Edward J. Boling, 95, American academic.
*Sir Patrick Eisdell Moore, 97, New Zealand surgeon.
Georges Kersaudy, 93–94, French translator.
Martin Krampen, 86, German semiotician.
Frances Kroll Ring, 99, American secretary and editor.
Ralph J. Roberts, 95, American businessman, founder of Comcast.
Jack Rollins, 100, American film producer (Annie Hall, The Purple Rose of Cairo, Irrational Man).
John M. Stephens, 82, American cameraman (Indiana Jones and the Temple of Doom) and cinematographer (Blacula, Sorcerer).
Kazuya Tatekabe, 80, Japanese voice actor (Doraemon, Time Bokan, Yatterman), acute respiratory failure.
Fredrik Fasting Torgersen, 80, Norwegian convicted murderer, complications of pneumonia.
Jim Vandiver, 75, American racing driver.
Danny Villanueva, 77, American football player (Los Angeles Rams, Dallas Cowboys) and broadcasting executive, co-founder of Univision, complications from a stroke.
Allen Weinstein, 77, American historian, Archivist of the United States (2005–2008), pneumonia.

19
Jack Aeby, 91, American photographer.
Jagjit Singh Anand, 93, Indian political activist and newspaper editor (Nawan Zamana).
Harold Battiste, 83, American jazz and R&B composer, arranger and musician (Sam Cooke, Sonny & Cher, Dr. John).
Joachim Boosfeld, 93, German officer in the Waffen-SS.
Jeff Bradstreet, 60, American medical researcher, suicide.
Jim Brailsford, 85, English cricketer (Derbyshire).
Esther Clenott, 91, American politician, Mayor of Portland, Maine (1989–1990).
Sir Harold Knight, 95, Australian economist, Governor of the Reserve Bank (1975–1982).
Len Matarazzo, 86, American baseball player (Philadelphia Athletics).
Earl Norem, 91, American comic book artist (Silver Surfer, He-Man and the Masters of the Universe).
Rondal Partridge, 97, American photographer.
Tukoji Rao Pawar, 51, Indian royal and politician, brain haemorrhage.
Bruce Poulton, 88, American educator, Chancellor of North Carolina State University (1982–1989).
Paul Quinn, 77, Australian rugby league player.
Venkoba Rao, 89, Indian cricketer.
James Salter, 90, American novelist.
Xie Tieli, 89, Chinese film director.

20
Robert K. Abbett, 89, American artist and illustrator.
William Brantley Aycock, 99, American educator, fall.
Bob Barry, Jr., 58, American sportscaster (KFOR), traffic collision.
Ian Bradley, 77, British-born New Zealand naval officer and politician.
Esther Brand, 92, South African athlete, Olympic champion (1952), complications of a fall.
JoAnn Dean Killingsworth, 91, American actress and dancer (Lullaby of Broadway, Red Garters), first person to play Snow White at Disneyland, cancer.
François Delapierre, 44, French politician, brain tumour.
Harold Feinstein, 84, American photographer.
Elson Floyd, 59, American educator, President of Washington State University (since 2007), complications from colon cancer.
James Kerzman, 68, American politician, member of the North Dakota House of Representatives (1991–2009), tractor accident.
Michael Kidson, 85, British schoolmaster (Eton College).
Robert S. Neuman, 88, American abstract painter and print maker.
Angelo Niculescu, 93, Romanian football player and manager.
Gerhard A. Ritter, 86, German historian.
Doug Rombough, 64, Canadian ice hockey player (New York Islanders, Buffalo Sabres).
Takanonami Sadahiro, 43, Japanese sumo wrestler and coach, heart failure.
Miriam Schapiro, 91, Canadian-born American painter, sculptor and printmaker.
Anthony Sydes, 74, American child actor (Miracle on 34th Street, Cheaper by the Dozen, Johnny Comes Flying Home).
Takeover Target, 15, Australian Thoroughbred racehorse, euthanised.
Nan Waddy, 100, Australian psychiatrist.

21
Robert Barritt, 88, Bermudian painter and politician, member of the House of Assembly (1985–1989) and Senate.
Tseng Chung-ming, 60, Taiwanese politician, cirrhosis and lung cancer.
Cora Combs, 92, American professional wrestler (NWA), complications from pneumonia.
Reg Ellis, 97, Australian cricketer.
Juan José Estrada, 51, Mexican boxer, WBA bantamweight champion (1988–1989), stabbed.
Ezkimo, 35, Finnish hip hop musician.
Dave Godfrey, 76, Canadian novelist and publisher, pancreatic cancer.
Darryl Hamilton, 50, American baseball player (Milwaukee Brewers, San Francisco Giants, New York Mets), shot.
John Hoerr, 84, American journalist and historian.
Roger Ishee, 85, American politician, member of the Mississippi House of Representatives (1997–2012).
Tony Longo, 53, American actor (Mulholland Drive, Angels in the Outfield, Eraser), heart failure.
Veijo Meri, 86, Finnish author.
Remo Remotti, 90, Italian actor (The Godfather Part III, Nine), playwright, painter, sculptor and poet.
Jim Rowan, 79, Scottish footballer (Airdrieonians, Celtic, Partick Thistle).
Alexander Schalck-Golodkowski, 82, East German politician.
Gunther Schuller, 89, American composer, conductor, historian and jazz musician, leukemia.
Lynn Steen, 74, American mathematician, heart failure.
Stanisław Szczepaniak, 80, Polish Olympic biathlete.
Carl Thompson, 33, Britain's heaviest man.
Arved Viirlaid, 93, Estonian-Canadian writer.
Dick Warwick, 87, Canadian ice hockey player (Penticton Vees).
Wayne Wettlaufer, 71, Canadian politician, member of the Legislative Assembly of Ontario (1995–2003), suspected heart attack.
Jules Wright, 67, Australian-born British theatre director (Royal Court Theatre), breast cancer.

22
Laura Antonelli, 73, Italian actress (Malicious, Till Marriage Do Us Part, The Innocent), heart attack.
Norm Berryman, 42, New Zealand rugby union player (national team), heart attack.
Carlinhos, 77, Brazilian football player and coach (Flamengo).
James Carnegie, 3rd Duke of Fife, 85, Scottish nobleman.
Constantin Cernăianu, 81, Romanian football player and coach.
Malcolm Colledge, 75, British archaeologist.
Joseph de Pasquale, 95, American violist.
Armand DiMele, 75, American psychotherapist and radio broadcaster, complications from pneumonia.
Jimmy Doyle, 76, Irish hurler (Tipperary).
Albert Evans, 46, American ballet dancer.
Don Featherstone, 79, American artist and inventor of the plastic pink flamingo, Lewy body dementia.
James Horner, 61, American film composer (Titanic, Field of Dreams, Apollo 13), Oscar winner (1998), plane crash.
Albert Ilemobade, 74, Nigerian academic, asphyxiation.
Inge Ivarson, 97, Swedish film producer.
Lyubov Kozyreva, 85, Russian Soviet cross-country skier, Olympic gold medalist (1956).
David E. Kyvig, 71, American Constitutional scholar, heart attack.
Buddy Landel, 53, American professional wrestler (SMW, USWA, WCW), injuries sustained in traffic collision.
Donnie MacLeod, 76, Canadian politician.
Guy Marchand, 71, French Olympic wrestler.
Gregorio Morales, 62, Spanish author.
Robert Sowell, 54, American football player (Miami Dolphins), heart attack.
Dick Stanfel, 87, American football player (Detroit Lions, Washington Redskins) and coach (New Orleans Saints).
Tama, 16, Japanese calico cat, stationmaster at Kishi Station, heart failure.
Ted Whelan, 85, Australian football player (Port Adelaide).
Gabriele Wohmann, 83, German author.

23
Jack Asher, 88, Scottish shinty player and referee.
Sanjeet Bedi, Indian actor (Sanjivani).
Praful Bidwai, 66, Indian journalist.
Sharon Bryant, 54, American tribal politician, Chief of the Monacan Indian Nation (since 2011), liver cancer.
Marujita Díaz, 83, Spanish singer and actress, complications from colon cancer.
Miguel Facussé Barjum, 90, Honduran businessman and landowner.
Tommy Hudspeth, 83, American football coach and administrator (Detroit Lions, Toronto Argonauts), cancer.
Nirmala Joshi, 80, Indian Roman Catholic religious sister, Superior General of the Missionaries of Charity (1997–2009).
Thé Lau, 62, Dutch singer and guitarist (The Scene), lung cancer.
Helmuth Lohner, 82, Austrian actor and theatre director.
Elizabeth MacLennan, 77, Scottish actress, writer and stage practitioner (7:84), leukaemia.
Alex Mathew, 57, Indian actor (Thoovanathumbikal), heart attack.
Donald Max, 58, Tanzanian politician, MP for Geita.
Ben Mboi, 80, Indonesian politician, Governor of East Nusa Tenggara (1978–1988).
Domenico Moschella, 67, Canadian politician, Montreal City Councillor.
Shusei Nagaoka, 78, Japanese illustrator.
Magali Noël, 83, Turkish-born French actress (Amarcord, La Dolce Vita) and singer.
Pat Peppler, 93, American football coach and executive (Atlanta Falcons).
Jacques Perrier, 90, French Olympic silver medallist basketball player (1948).
Harvey Pollack, 93, American sport statistician, last surviving employee from first NBA season.
Ajit Singh, 74, Indian-born British economist.
Lonnie Spurrier, 83, American Olympic middle-distance runner (1956).
Tom Stagg, 92, American judge, U.S. District Court Chief Judge for the Western District of Louisiana (1984–1991).
Dick Van Patten, 86, American actor (Eight Is Enough, Spaceballs, Robin Hood: Men in Tights), complications from diabetes.
Sir Chris Woodhead, 68, British educationalist, Chief Inspector for Ofsted (1994–2000), motor neurone disease.

24
Cristiano Araújo, 29, Brazilian singer and songwriter, traffic collision.
Dileep Singh Bhuria, 71, Indian politician.
Mario Biaggi, 97, American politician, member of the U.S. House of Representatives from New York (1969–1988).
Walter Browne, 66, Australian-born American chess Grandmaster, six-time U.S. champion.
Marva Collins, 78, American educator.
Susan Ahn Cuddy, 100, American Navy officer.
Ruqaiya Hasan, 83, Indian linguist.
João Lopes, 95, Portuguese Olympic equestrian.
John Joe Nerney, 93, Irish Gaelic footballer (Roscommon).
John Palmer, 64, British criminal, shot.
Robert Hugh Pickering, 82, Canadian politician and curler.
John Winn, 94, British army officer.

25
Lou Butera, 78, American pool player, Parkinson's disease.
Sir Graham Dorey, 82, Guernsey judge, Bailiff of Guernsey (1992–1999).
Gordon Fearnley, 65, English footballer (Bristol Rovers).
Graham Gilchrist, 82, Australian football player (Carlton).
Hal Gould, 95, American photographer and gallery curator.
Gunnar Kulldorff, 87, Swedish statistician.
Maravene Loeschke, 68, American college administrator (Towson University), adrenal cancer.
Patrick Macnee, 93, English-American actor (The Avengers, This Is Spinal Tap, A View to a Kill).
Hélène Monette, 55, Canadian poet, cancer.
*Nerses Bedros XIX Tarmouni, 75, Egyptian-born Armenian Catholic hierarch, Patriarch-Catholicos of Cilicia (since 1999).
Vithal Rao, 85, Indian ghazal singer.
Jamie Reid, 74, Canadian writer and activist.
Alejandro Romay, 88, Argentine businessman (Canal 9).
Alex Scott, 85, Australian-British actor.
Jan de Voogd, 90, Dutch politician, member of the House of Representatives (1977–1981).
Theodore Weesner, 79, American author.
O'Kelley Whitaker, 88, American prelate, Episcopal Bishop of Central New York.

26
Paul Ambros, 82, German Hall of Fame ice hockey player (EV Füssen, unified team).
Pétur Blöndal, 71, Icelandic politician and mathematician.
Roger Bordier, 92, French author. (death announced on this date) 
Larry Carberry, 79, English footballer (Ipswich Town).
Damion Cook, 36, American football player (Detroit Lions), heart attack.
Jerome M. Hughes, 85, American politician, President of the Minnesota Senate (1983–1993).
David McAlister, 64, British actor (Hollyoaks, Doctor Who), cancer.
Matti Makkonen, 63, Finnish telecommunications engineer.
Richard Matt, 49, American convicted murderer and prison escapee, shot.
Norman Poole, 95, British World War II paratrooper.
Yevgeny Primakov, 85, Russian politician and diplomat, Prime Minister (1998–1999).
Gustavo Sainz, 74, Mexican writer.
Kája Saudek, 80, Czech comics illustrator.
Kal Segrist, 84, American baseball player (New York Yankees, Baltimore Orioles).
Shiv Singh, 76, Indian artist.
Alexa Suelzer, 97, American author, educator and theologian.
Chris Thompson, 63, American writer and producer (Laverne & Shirley, Bosom Buddies, Shake It Up!).
Denis Thwaites, 70, English footballer (Birmingham City), shot.
David Turner, 91, American rower, Olympic gold medalist (1948).
Donald Wexler, 89, American architect.

27
Jane Aaron, 67, American filmmaker and children's book illustrator (Sesame Street, Between the Lions), cancer.
Eric Dunn, 85, New Zealand cricketer.
Zvi Elpeleg, 89, Polish-born Israeli diplomat and academic.
Elery Hamilton-Smith, 85, Australian academic and conservationist.
Knut Helle, 84, Norwegian historian.
Harvey McGregor, 89, British barrister, Warden of New College, Oxford (1985–1996).
Ghias Mela, 53, Pakistani politician, member of the National Assembly from Sargodha (1997–1999, 2002–2007, 2008–2013), cardiac arrest.
Boris Shilkov, 87, Russian speed skater, Olympic champion (1956).
Chris Squire, 67, English bass guitarist (Yes), acute erythroid leukaemia.
Bronius Vyšniauskas, 92, Lithuanian sculptor.

28
Ian Allan, 92, British publisher (Ian Allan Publishing).
Pete Athas, 67, American football player (New York Giants), lymphoma.
Goran Brajković, 36, Croatian football player, traffic collision.
Robert C. Broward, 89, American architect.
Jack Carter, 93, American comedian (Cavalcade of Stars) and actor (Dr. Kildare, Alligator), respiratory failure.
Carlyle Crockwell, 83, Bermudian football referee.
Edgar Dawson, 83, British rugby league player.
Dietrich Haugk, 90, German film director and voice actor.
Louis Norberg Howard, 86, American mathematician.
Thomas P. Kennedy, 63, American politician.
Joe Lobenstein, 88, German-born British politician.
Liam Ó Murchú, 86, Irish broadcaster (RTÉ).
Jope Seniloli, 76, Fijian politician, Vice-President (2001–2004).
Sivuqaq, 21, American walrus and animal actor (50 First Dates), heart failure.
Todor Slavov, 31, Bulgarian rally driver, race crash.
Wally Stanowski, 96, Canadian ice hockey player (Toronto Maple Leafs, New York Rangers).
Ben Wattenberg, 81, American author and political commentator, complications from surgery.
Bart Williams, 65, American documentary filmmaker and actor (MADtv), cancer.

29
Hisham Barakat, 64, Egyptian prosecutor, car bombing.
Forrest Behm, 95, American football player.
Helge Ole Bergesen, 65, Norwegian political scientist and politician, cancer.
Ladislav Chudík, 91, Slovak actor (Kawasaki's Rose).
Bill Cross, 97, British World War II soldier and Legion of honour recipient.
Willie Daniel, 77, American football player (Pittsburgh Steelers, Los Angeles Rams).
Rabbe Grönblom, 65, Finnish chief executive, founder of Kotipizza.
Kauto Star, 15, French-born British-trained racehorse, dual winner of the Cheltenham Gold Cup, euthanized.
Clayton Kenny, 86, Canadian Olympic boxer (1952).
Josef Masopust, 84, Czech football player and manager (Dukla Prague, national team).
Joseph Bryan Nelson, 83, British ornithologist.
Charles Pasqua, 88, French politician, Minister of the Interior (1986–1988, 1993–1995).
Mujibar Rahman, 96, Bangladeshi medical scientist.
Bruce Rowland, 74, British rock drummer (Fairport Convention).
Jackson Vroman, 34, American-Lebanese basketball player (Phoenix Suns, New Orleans Hornets, Lebanese national team), drowned.

30
Charles W. Bagnal, 81, American Army lieutenant general.
Edward Burnham, 98, English actor (To Sir, with Love, 10 Rillington Place, Doctor Who).
Robert Dewar, 70, English-born American computer scientist (AdaCore), cancer.
Raymond Dot, 88, French Olympic gymnast.
Reiner Hanschke, 74, German Olympic hockey player.
Charles Harbutt, 79, American photographer, emphysema.
Ronald Kissell, 82, Australian cricketer.
Eddy Louiss, 74, French jazz organist.
K. P. P. Nambiar, 86, Indian industrialist.
Paolo Piffarerio, 90, Italian animator and cartoonist (Alan Ford).
Arthur Porter, 59, Canadian physician, lung cancer.
Leonard Starr, 89, American cartoonist (ThunderCats).
Khosrow Shakeri Zand, 76, Iranian author and human rights activist.

References

2015-06
 06